The 40th Canadian Parliament was in session from November 18, 2008 to March 26, 2011. It was the last Parliament of the longest-running minority government in Canadian history that began with the previous Parliament. The membership of its House of Commons was determined by the results of the 2008 federal election held on October 14, 2008. Its first session was then prorogued by the Governor General on December 4, 2008, at the request of Prime Minister Stephen Harper, who was facing a likely no-confidence motion and a coalition agreement between the Liberal party and the New Democratic Party with the support of the Bloc Québécois (2008–2009 Canadian parliamentary dispute). Of the 308 MPs elected at the October 14, 2008 general election, 64 were new to Parliament and three sat in Parliaments previous to the 39th: John Duncan, Jack Harris and Roger Pomerleau.

There were three sessions of the 40th Parliament. On March 25, 2011, the House of Commons passed a Liberal motion of non-confidence by a vote of 156 to 145, finding the Conservative Cabinet in contempt of parliament, an unprecedented finding in Canadian and Commonwealth parliamentary history. On March 26, 2011, Prime Minister Stephen Harper subsequently asked Governor General David Johnston to dissolve parliament and issue a writ of election.

Party standings
The party standings as of the election, and at dissolution, were as follows:

Resignations and by-elections

NDP MP Dawn Black resigned her seat of New Westminster—Coquitlam effective April 13, 2009, to run (successfully) in the provincial riding of New Westminster in the 2009 British Columbia general election. The NDP's Fin Donnelly won the seat left vacant by Black in a by-election on November 9, 2009.

Independent MP Bill Casey resigned his seat of Cumberland—Colchester—Musquodoboit Valley effective April 30, 2009, to accept a job as the Nova Scotia Department of Intergovernmental Affairs' senior representative in Ottawa.  He was a former Conservative who voted against the 2007 budget, claiming that it broke the Atlantic Accord with his province and Newfoundland and Labrador, and was subsequently expelled from the Conservative caucus. Scott Armstrong, the Conservative candidate, won the by-election for this seat on November 9, 2009.

Bloc Québécois MP Paul Crête resigned his seat of Montmagny—L'Islet—Kamouraska—Rivière-du-Loup on May 21, 2009, to run in a provincial by-election in Rivière-du-Loup. Conservative Bernard Généreux won the November 9, 2009 by-election for this seat.

Bloc Québécois MP Réal Ménard resigned his seat of Hochelaga on September 16, 2009, to run in Montreal's municipal elections. On November 9, 2009, Daniel Paillé won this seat for the Bloc in a by-election.

New Democratic Party MP Judy Wasylycia-Leis (Winnipeg North) resigned from the House on April 30, 2010, to run (unsuccessfully) for the mayoralty of Winnipeg. Liberal Kevin Lamoureux won the by-election to replace her on November 29, 2010.

Liberal MP Maurizio Bevilacqua (Vaughan) resigned from the House effective August 25, 2010 to successfully run for mayor in Vaughan. Conservative Julian Fantino won the November 29, 2010 by-election to replace him.

Conservative MP Inky Mark (Dauphin—Swan River—Marquette) resigned from the House effective September 15, 2010 to run for mayor in Dauphin. Robert Sopuck held the seat for the Conservatives in a by-election held on November 29, 2010.

Bloc Québécois MP Jean-Yves Roy resigned from the House effective October 22, 2010, followed by Conservative MP Jay Hill effective October 25, 2010. Conservative MP Jim Prentice resigned from the House effective November 14, 2010 to take a position with CIBC. By-elections in these three ridings were not scheduled prior to the issue of the writ for the 41st general election.

1st session and prorogation

The first session of the 40th parliament opened on November 18, 2008, after Prime Minister Stephen Harper and the Conservatives won a slightly stronger minority government in the 2008 election. With a new government in session, Finance Minister Jim Flaherty tabled a fiscal update nine days later. Among other things, the update cut government spending, suspended the ability of civil servants to strike, sold off some Crown assets, and eliminated existing political party subsidies. This fiscal update was rejected by the opposition, and became a catalyst for talks of a coalition government. Stéphane Dion of the Liberal Party and Jack Layton of the New Democratic Party, signed an accord stating that in the event that the government lost the confidence of the house, they would form a coalition with the support of Gilles Duceppe and the Bloc Québécois, if asked to do so by the Governor General of Canada Michaëlle Jean. However, Stephen Harper delayed the vote of non-confidence scheduled for December 1, and the Governor General prorogued parliament on Harper's advice on December 4, 2008, until January 26, 2009.

After prorogation, calls came from within the Liberal Party for Dion to resign immediately. Dion initially scheduled his resignation for the party's leadership convention in May 2009, but on December 8, 2008, he announced that he would step down upon the selection of an interim leader. After the withdrawal of Bob Rae and Dominic LeBlanc from the 2009 leadership race, Michael Ignatieff became the only leadership candidate, and therefore was appointed interim leader of the Liberals and the opposition on December 10, 2008.

2nd Session and prorogation
The Governor-in-Council recalled parliament on January 26, 2009. Its first business (after the Throne Speech) was to present the federal budget, which included a large deficit. After negotiations with new opposition leader Michael Ignatieff, the government promised to present regular updates on the stimulus budget, and the Liberals and Conservatives joined to pass the budget and keep the Conservative government in power. The Conservative government made crime a major focus of the session. The Conservatives reintroduced their former mandatory minimums bill, known as Bill C-15.

On December 30, 2009, Prime Minister Stephen Harper announced that he would advise the Governor General to prorogue parliament during the 2010 Winter Olympics, until March 3, 2010. He telephoned Governor General Michaëlle Jean to ask her permission to end the parliamentary session and Jean signed the proclamation later that day.
According to Harper's spokesman, he sought his second prorogation to consult with Canadians about the economy. In an interview with CBC News, Prince Edward Island Liberal member of parliament Wayne Easter accused the Prime Minister of "shutting democracy down". The second prorogation in a year also received some international criticism as being not very democratic.

In response to the prorogation, demonstrations took place on January 23, 2010, in over 60 Canadian cities, and at least four cities in other countries. The protests attracted thousands of participants, many who had joined a group on Facebook.

Senate appointments
The Senate of Canada has seen new members appointed in blocs of 18, 9, and 5; all were appointed to the Conservative caucus. The balance of power shifted for the first time on August 27, 2009, when the Liberal caucus was reduced to holding a plurality of 52 seats. On January 29, 2010, the balance shifted again as five vacancies were filled by appointed Conservatives, giving them a plurality of 51, with the Liberals holding the next-highest number of seats at 49. The Conservatives achieved an absolute majority when Don Meredith and Larry Smith were appointed on December 20, 2010. After dissolution, Smith and Fabian Manning resigned to run in the 2011 election. That reduced the Conservative caucus to 52, but they retained a majority of sitting senators as there were 50 senators of other parties and 3 vacancies.

Honorary Senators
The Senate of Canada posthumously awarded the title of Honorary Senator during the 40th Parliament to five pioneering women known as The Famous Five.

Members

Committees

House

Standing Committee on Aboriginal Affairs and Northern Development
Standing Committee on Access to Information, Privacy and Ethics
Standing Committee on Agriculture and Agri-Food
Standing Committee on Canadian Heritage
Standing Committee on Citizenship and Immigration
Standing Committee on Environment and Sustainable Development
Standing Committee on Finance
Standing Committee on Fisheries and Oceans
Standing Committee on Foreign Affairs and International Development
Standing Committee on Government Operations and Estimates
Standing Committee on Health
Standing Committee on Human Resources, Skills and Social Development and the Status of Persons with Disabilities
Standing Committee on Industry, Science and Technology
Standing Committee on International Trade
Standing Committee on Justice and Human Rights
Standing Committee on National Defence
Standing Committee on Natural Resources
Standing Committee on Official Languages
Standing Committee on Procedure and House Affairs
Standing Committee on Public Accounts
Standing Committee on Public Safety and National Security
Standing Committee on the Status of Women
Standing Committee on Transport, Infrastructure and Communities
Standing Committee on Veterans Affairs

Senate

Standing Committee on Aboriginal Peoples
Special Committee on Aging
Standing Committee on Agriculture and Forestry
Special Committee on Anti-terrorism
Standing Committee on Banking, Trade and Commerce
Standing Committee on Conflict of Interest for Seniors
Standing Committee on Energy, the Environment and Natural Resources
Standing Committee on Fisheries and Oceans
Standing Committee on Foreign Affairs and International Trade
Standing Committee on Human Rights
Standing Committee on Internal Economy, Budgets and Administration
Standing Committee on Legal and Constitutional Affairs
Standing Committee on National Finance
Standing Committee on National Security and Defence
Subcommittee on Veterans Affairs
Standing Committee on Official Languages
Standing Committee on Rules, Procedures and the Rights of Parliament
Selection Committee
Standing Committee on Social Affairs, Science and Technology
Subcommittee on Cities
Subcommittee on Population Health
Standing Committee on Transport and Communications

Joint Committees

Standing Joint Committee on Library of Parliament
Standing Joint Committee on Scrutiny of Regulations

Officeholders

Speakers
 Senate: Noël Kinsella, Conservative Senator for New Brunswick.
 House of Commons: Peter Milliken, the Liberal member for Kingston and the Islands.

Other Chair occupants
Senate
 Speaker pro tempore of the Canadian Senate:
 Rose-Marie Losier-Cool, Liberal Senator from New Brunswick (until March 2, 2010)
 Donald H. Oliver, Conservative Senator for Nova Scotia (from March 4, 2010)

House of Commons
 House of Commons Deputy Speaker and Chair of Committees of the Whole: Andrew Scheer, Conservative member for Regina—Qu'Appelle
 Deputy Chair of Committees of the Whole: Denise Savoie, NDP member for Victoria
 Assistant Deputy Chair of Committees of the Whole: Barry Devolin, Conservative member for Haliburton—Kawartha Lakes—Brock

Leaders
 Prime Minister of Canada: Rt. Hon. Stephen Harper (Conservative)
 Leader of the Opposition (Liberal):
 Hon. Stéphane Dion (until December 9, 2008)
 Hon. Michael Ignatieff (acting from December 10, 2008, permanent from May 2, 2009)
 Bloc Québécois leader: Gilles Duceppe
 New Democratic Party leader: Hon. Jack Layton

Floor leaders
Senate
 Leader of the Government in the Senate: Hon. Marjory LeBreton
 Leader of the Opposition in the Senate: Jim Cowan

House of Commons
 Government House Leader:
 Hon. Jay Hill (until Aug 6, 2010)
 Hon. John Baird (from Aug 6, 2010)
 Opposition House Leader:
 Hon. Ralph Goodale (until Sept 9, 2010)
 David McGuinty (from Sept 8, 2010)
 Bloc Québécois House Leader: Pierre Paquette
 New Democratic Party House Leader: Libby Davies

Whips
Senate
 Government Whip in the Senate:
Terry Stratton (until Dec 31, 2009)
Consiglio Di Nino (from Jan 1, 2010)
 Deputy Government Whip in the Senate: Stephen Greene
 Opposition Whip in the Senate: Jim Munson
 Deputy Opposition Whip in the Senate: Elizabeth Hubley

House of Commons
 Chief Government Whip: Hon. Gordon O'Connor
 Deputy Government Whip: Harold Albrecht
 Official Opposition Whip:
 Rodger Cuzner (until Sept 10, 2010)
 Marcel Proulx (from Sept 10, 2010)
 Bloc Québécois Whip:
 Michel Guimond (until June 22, 2010)
 Claude DeBellefeuille (from June 23, 2010)
 New Democratic Party Whip: Yvon Godin

Shadow cabinets
 Official Opposition Shadow Cabinet of the 40th Parliament of Canada
 Bloc Québécois Shadow Cabinet of the 40th Parliament of Canada
 New Democratic Party Shadow Cabinet of the 40th Parliament of Canada

By-elections

References

External links

 
2008 establishments in Canada
2011 disestablishments in Canada
Stephen Harper
Minority governments